Henry K. Okamura (1924 – May 25, 2005), was an American four time US National Judo Champion.

Okamura co-authored a book in 1960 called How to Improve Your Judo.  Okamura was awarded an 8th dan in judo.

Okamura lived in an internment camp for Japanese-American citizens during World War II following the enforcement of Executive Order 9066.  He suffered a stroke during his later years.

He was married to his wife, Mitsuko and was survived by a daughter, Bonnie; a son, Henry Jr.; a daughter-in-law, Leslie; a brother, James; and two sisters, Marie Yamauchi and Ruth Yamamoto.

References

1924 births
2005 deaths
Judoka trainers
American male judoka
American people of Japanese descent
Japanese-American internees
American sportspeople of Japanese descent
20th-century American people
21st-century American people